Chertsey Cricket Club in Surrey is one of the oldest cricket clubs in England, the foundation of the club dating to the 1730s. The club is based in Chertsey and plays in the Surrey Championship.

Three known matches were played in 1736, one against Croydon Cricket Club at Duppas Hill in Croydon followed by a return match at the Laleham Burway ground in Chertsey. A deciding game on Richmond Green was played on 5 July. In each of the two matches, the home team won "by a great number of runs".

The club played a number of matches against London Cricket Club and Dartford Cricket Club. In the 1760s, they played matches against the sport's rising power, the Hambledon Club, and in September 1778, Chertsey beat the rest of England (excluding Hampshire) by an innings and 24 runs.

The Duke of Dorset (who played cricket for Chertsey) was appointed as Ambassador to France in 1784 and arranged to have the Chertsey team travel to France in 1789 to introduce cricket to the French, apparently to improve Anglo-French relations. However, the team, on arrival at Dover, met the Ambassador returning from France at the outset of the French Revolution, and the opportunity was missed.

Chertsey produced several famous players in the 18th century including the great bowler Edward "Lumpy" Stevens and the noted wicket-keeper William Yalden.

Bibliography

External links
 

Former senior cricket clubs
English cricket teams in the 18th century
Sports clubs established in the 1730s
1737 establishments in England
English club cricket teams
Cricket in Surrey